Orhan Kapucu  (born 29 September 1959, in Batman) is a Turkish former footballer and most recently the manager of Batman Petrolspor.

Club career
Kapucu played for Fenerbahçe S.K., Diyarbakırspor, Samsunspor and Malatyaspor in the Turkish Süper Lig.

International career
Kapucu made one appearance for the senior Turkey national football team, a qualifying match for Euro 1988 against Northern Ireland on 12 November 1986.

References

1959 births
Living people
Turkish footballers
Turkey international footballers
Turkish football managers
Samsunspor footballers
Malatyaspor footballers
Fenerbahçe S.K. footballers
Adanaspor footballers
Antalyaspor footballers
Çaykur Rizespor footballers
Batman Petrolspor footballers

Association football midfielders